The 1999 Arizona State Sun Devils football team represented Arizona State University during the 1999 NCAA Division I-A football season.  The team's head coach was Bruce Snyder, who was coaching his eighth season with the Sun Devils and 20th season overall. Home games were played at Sun Devil Stadium in Tempe, Arizona. They participated as members of the Pacific-10 Conference.

Schedule

Rankings

Roster

References

Arizona State
Arizona State Sun Devils football seasons
Arizona State Sun Devils football